Mount Sir-Wilfrid (formerly "Montagne du Diable") is located in the Montagne-du-Diable Regional Park, south-east of the Baskatong Reservoir, in the Hautes-Laurentides region, in the municipality of Ferme-Neuve, in Antoine-Labelle Regional County Municipality (MRC), in Laurentides (region), in Quebec, in Canada.

Geography 
The summit of this mountain (summit at 783 m) is located at about 15 km northwest of Mont-Laurier and near Lake Windigo. In this sector of the Laurentian Mountains, the relief form an oblong mass of about 8 km by 5 km.

The summit has four peaks:
 the top of the Devil: 783 meters;
 the top of Belzébuth: 749 meters;
 the top of the Garde-feu: 756 meters;
 the top of the Dawn Wall: 740 meters.

History 
According to a legend, this mountain is haunted by the Wendigo or Windigo, an evil spirit from Algonquin mythology. 

Popularly, this mountain is designated "Montagne du Diable", a French adaptation of the old term Windigo used in this area to designate the stream and the lake. The toponymic designation Sir-Wilfrid was assigned in 1932; this designation is similar to the toponym Mont-Laurier, which the town is nearby. This toponymic designation evokes the memory of Wilfrid Laurier (1841-1919), Prime Minister of Canada, from 1896 to 1911.

Montagne-du-Diable Regional Park 
The mount Sir-Wilfrid is the main mountain of the Montagne-du-Diable Regional Park. This park offers many activities and services to visitors who are fond of mountain hiking.

Toponymy 
This mount was named in honor of Prime Minister of Canada Wilfrid Laurier.

The toponym "Mont Sir-Wilfrid" was made official on December 5, 1968 at the Place names bank of the Commission de toponymie du Québec.

See also 
Montagne-du-Diable Regional Park
List of mountains of Quebec

Notes and references 

Summits of Laurentides
Antoine-Labelle Regional County Municipality
Reportedly haunted locations in Quebec
Mountains of Quebec under 1000 metres